Lespouey is a commune in the Hautes-Pyrénées department in the south west of France.

See also
Communes of the Hautes-Pyrénées department

References

Communes of Hautes-Pyrénées